Pianoforte is a 1984 Italian drama film. It is the debut film of director Francesca Comencini. Pianoforte won the "De Sica" award at the 1984 Venice Film Festival.

For her performance Giulia Boschi, at her film debut, was awarded as best actress at the Rio de Janeiro Film Festival and won a Silver Ribbon for best new actress.

Cast 
 Giulia Boschi: Maria
 François : Paolo
 Giovannella Grifeo: Alessandra 
 Karl Zinny: Robertino
 Marie-Christine Barrault: Maria's mother

References

External links

1984 films
Italian drama films
Films about drugs
Films scored by Guido & Maurizio De Angelis
Films directed by Francesca Comencini
Films with screenplays by Vincenzo Cerami
1984 directorial debut films
1980s Italian-language films
1980s Italian films